Esso is a village in Kamchatka Krai, Russia. It is the administrative centre of Bystrinsky District. It has been described as one of the most scenic villages in Russia.

Geography 
Esso is located in the central part of the Kamchatka Peninsula. It is located at the convergence of the Bystraya and Uksichan Rivers.

Attractions 
Esso has multiple notable sites, making it attractive to tourists. These include hot springs near the edge of the village, with temperatures often reaching . Thermal springs also heat an outdoor swimming pool in the central part of the village. In addition to its hot springs, Esso is home to Kamchatka's only ethnographic museum. The museum documents the traditions and architecture of the indigenous Even and Koryak peoples, as well as those of Russian and Cossack settlers.

Climate 
Esso's climate can be classified as subarctic, or Dfc under the Köppen climate classification.

References 

Cities and towns in Kamchatka Krai